Süleymanpaşa is a district and second level municipality in Tekirdağ Province, Turkey. According to the 2012 Metropolitan Municipalities Law (law no. 6360), all Turkish provinces with a population more than 750 000, will be a metropolitan municipality and the districts within the metropolitan municipalities  will be second level municipalities. The law also creates new districts within the provinces in addition to present districts. These changes will be effective by the local elections in 2014.

In 2014 the district was renamed to Süleymanpaşa. The name Süleymanpaşa refers to the Ottoman prince Süleyman, the first commander of Turkish troops in Thrace in the 14th century.

Rural area
There were four towns and 55 villages in the rural area of Süleymanpaşa district. Now their official status became "neighborhood of Süleymanpaşa".

Cherry Festival
The district municipality has been organizing "International Tekirdağ Cherry Festival" (l) each year four days long in the first or second week of June. Established under name "Cherry Jolly" ("Kiraz Cümbüşü") n 1962, the event was renamed to "Cherry Festivity" ("Kiraz Bayramı")in 1964. In later years, it included cultural and entertainment programs and became traditional. In 2020 and 2021, the event was cancelled due to the COVID-19 pandemic in Turkey. The festival features  parades, illuminated processions,  exhibitions, shows, night concerts, a cherry contest, a sailing contest, a festival beauty contest, picnics etc.

References

Districts of Tekirdağ Province
Tekirdağ